Hammerstein station is a transit station of the Wuppertal Schwebebahn monorail.

It is located in the city of Wuppertal, in Westphalia, Germany.

References

Wuppertal Schwebebahn
Monorail stations
Railway stations in Wuppertal